Pennisetum orientale, the oriental fountain grass, is a species of flowering plant in the grass family Poaceae, native to North West Asia and North Africa. The panicles are pale pink, maturing to brown. 

The plant is not entirely hardy, disliking prolonged freezing temperatures. In cultivation it requires a sheltered position and some winter protection in colder areas. It has gained the Royal Horticultural Society’s Award of Garden Merit.

References

orientale